Hephaestus carbo, the coal grunter or black grunter, is a species of freshwater ray-finned fish, a grunter from the family Terapontidae. It is endemic to rivers in northern Australia.

Description
Hephaestus carbo has a deep body which is oblong and oval in shape and also slightly compressed. The dorsal profile is straight from the snout to the nape, then there is a bugle between the head and the start of the dorsal fin. The  ventral profile is evenly curved from the tip of the lower jaw to the anus. The upper jaw is slightly longer than the lower jaw and the mouth is oblique and equipped with villiform teeth with much larger teeth in the outer row. The lateral line is continuous and evenly curved. The dorsal fin is continuous, the spiny part is low and contains 11-13 spines and is arched in shape with the fifth to seventh spines being the longest although the longest dorsal spine is shorter than the longest dorsal soft ray, the soft-rayed part of the dorsal fin is rounded and contains 13-14 soft rays. All 3 anal spines are short, robust and curved with the first one being half as long as second soft anal rounded with the third being slightly shorter than the second. The anal fin soft rays are all longer than the spines and there are 11-12 of them. The caudal fin is rounded to truncate. The head, body, and fins are a uniform blackish colour overall, with gold speckles over the head and body. The juveniles are more colourful than the adults and have bright yellow to orange markings with a reddish-orange ring around the eye.

Distribution
Hephaestus carbo has only been recorded from northern Australia where it is found in the Goyder River in the Northern Territory and the rivers which drain into the Gulf of Carpentaria and the Timor Sea in Queensland from the Gregory River in the east to the Jardine River.

Habitat and biology
Hephaestus carbo shows a preference for clear, flowing water over a sandy substrate, but it is recorded in turbid water with a muddy substrate at times. They are predatory and feed on small fishes and crustaceans, particularly prawns. Spawning is known to occur from November and it most likely continues until the early autumn  in March. The males do not care for the eggs.

Taxonomy
Hephaestus carbo was first formally described in 1916 as Terapon carbo by the Australian zoologists James Douglas Ogilby and Allan Riverstone McCulloch with the type locality given as the upper waters of the Gregory River in Queensland. The coal grunter is very similar to, and closely related to, Raymond's grunter (Hephaestus raymondi) of New Guinea.

Usage
The colourful juveniles are found in the aquarium trade.

References

carbo
Fish described in 1916